Rivers in the Wasteland is the fifth studio album by American Christian rock band Needtobreathe, released on April 15, 2014, through Atlantic Records, Curb Records and Word Records. The album was produced by the band along with Kevin Augunas, Ed Cash, Joe Chiccarelli and Jerrod Bettis at various studios.

The album debuted at No. 1 on the Billboard Christian Albums chart, No. 1 on the Billboard Rock Albums chart and No. 3 on the Billboard 200 chart.

The album's fourth single, "Multiplied", was nominated for a Grammy at the 57th Annual Grammy Awards in the Best Contemporary Christian Music Performance/Song category. The album's fifth and final single, "Brother", proved to be the band's biggest hit to date, peaking at No. 98 on the Billboard Hot 100.

Background and recording
Rivers in the Wasteland was recorded from December 2012 through December 2013. It was produced by the band along with Kevin Augunas, Ed Cash, Joe Chiccarelli and Jerrod Bettis. The album was recorded at Plantation Studios in Charleston, South Carolina, Fairfax Recordings in Van Nuys, California, Blackbird Studios in Nashville, Tennessee and Ed's in Franklin, Tennessee.

Critical reception

Rivers in the Wasteland received mostly positive reviews from music critics. Tony Cummings, founder of Cross Rhythms, rated the album a perfect ten squares, calling it a "delicious album" that  "demonstrates once again that when you've got quality songwriting and a band on the top of their game, all resistance melts away." At CCM Magazine, Matt Conner rated the album four stars out of five, calling the release a "spirited" affair on which has "Needtobreathe's signature Southern rock stomps circles 'round Bear Rinehart's distinct vocal for another 11-song feast that just might be their best yet." At Milwaukee Journal Sentinel, Piet Levy gave the album a positive review, writing that "the inspiration can be found in the beauty of its lyrics", and that when the band gets around to praising the Lord that "the effect is more powerful than anything on the latest albums from Christian acts like Casting Crowns, MercyMe, Chris Tomlin or TobyMac."

Timothy Monger of AllMusic rated the album three-and-a-half stars out of four, remarking that "If Needtobreathe's intention was to deliver a more down-to-earth and reflective record following The Reckoning's big-budget glitz, they've succeeded." At New Release Tuesday, Kevin Davis rated the album a perfect five stars, writing that "Every song is absolutely amazing" because "[t]he very relatable and transparent words of these songs use poetic descriptions and biblical language throughout eleven stellar tracks". Kate Padilla of The Spencer Daily Reporter liked Bear's vocal tone, claiming that singling out a few standout tracks would be a shear lesson in futility because "The entire thing is great, from beginning to end and back again." At PopMatters, Jeff Koch rated the album five discs out of ten, cautioning how "these rivers run too shallow to irrigate this wasteland."

At Jesus Freak Hideout, four reviewers, Jen Rose, Jerrold Wallace, John DiBiase, and Timothy Estabrooks, all gave the same rating of four-and-a-half stars out of five. Rose says that the release "represents an already great band at their finest". Wallace writes that "The appropriately titled Rivers in the Wasteland is a tale of redemption and perseverance" because the band had its share of "ups and down," and that they have "pushed through and created some of their finest work to date." DiBiase remarked that the release "is a refreshing listening experience", while Estabrooks called the release simply "phenomenal."

At Christian Music Zine, Graeme Jones rated the album a perfect five stars, remarking how the release "doesn’t disappoint" because it is "quality musically and lyrically." Andrew Funderburk of CM Addict rated the album four stars out of five, stating that "It’s an album filled with strength down to the last track." At 365 Days of Inspiring Media, Jonathan Andre rated the album four stars out of five, writing how it is "a gem of an album". Timothy Yap of Hallels gave the album a modestly positive review, saying while some songs on the release don't work well that "Gone are the thinly cloaked inspirational songs, and moving right in are songs that penetrate from the superficial to the eternal."

Commercial performance
Rivers in the Wasteland debuted at No. 3 on the US Billboard 200 chart, selling 49,000 copies in its first week of release. The sales were good enough for No. 1 on the Top Christian Albums and Top Rock Albums charts, and No. 6 on the Canadian Albums Chart. As of January 2015, the album has sold 150,000 copies in the US.

Track listing

Personnel 
Credits adapted from AllMusic

Needtobreathe
 Bear Rinehart – lead vocals, synthesizers, guitars, slide guitar
 Bo Rinehart – synthesizers, guitars, banjo, mandola, percussion, backing vocals
 Seth Bolt – bass guitar, electric upright bass, percussion, backing vocals

Additional musicians

 Josh Lovelace – keyboards, organ, backing vocals
 Roger Joseph Manning, Jr. – keyboards
  Ed Cash – acoustic piano, programming, electric guitar, bass guitar 
 Jonathan Smith – programming, acoustic guitar, banjo
 Randall Harris – synthesizers, drums, percussion 
 Scott Cash – acoustic guitar, electric guitar, backing vocals
 Michael Trent – acoustic guitar, electric guitar, backing vocals, additional arrangements 
 Carl Broemel – lap steel guitar
 Paul Mabury – drums
 Jason Freese – saxophone
 Francisco Torres – trombone
 Ron Blake – trumpet
 Ivory Layne – backing vocals

Technical

 Seth Bolt – engineer (1-9, 11), mixing (1, 2, 7)
 Randall Harris – engineer (1, 2, 5-9), mixing (1, 2), additional engineer 
 Lowell Reynolds – engineer (2, 3, 5, 7, 11)
 Clif Norrell – engineer (2, 4, 6)
 Gavin Paddock – engineer (2, 4, 6)
 Bo Rinehart – mixing (2, 7)
 Ryan Hewitt – mixing (3-6, 11)
 Joe Chiccarelli – engineer (5)
 Mikey Reaves – engineer (6, 7, 11)
 Ed Cash – engineer (9, 10), mixing (9, 10)
 Neil B. Young – additional engineer (2), engineer (6)
 Scott Cash – additional engineer (9, 10)
 David Leonard – additional engineer (9)
 Ben Levy – mix assistant  (3-6, 11)
 Roman Urazov – mix assistant (3-6, 11)
 Bob Ludwig – mastering at Gateway Mastering (Portland, Maine)
Design 
 Pete Ganbarg – A&R
 Fuller Moehagen for AKT – layout
 Bo Rinehart – art direction, design
 Bryan Nash Gills – woodcut imagery
 Sully Sullivan – photography

Charts

Weekly charts

Year-end charts

Singles

References
Notes

Footnotes

External links
 Rivers in the Wasteland album

2014 albums
Needtobreathe albums
Atlantic Records albums
Word Records albums
Curb Records albums
Albums produced by Joe Chiccarelli